À fleur de toi is the debut studio album by French singer Vitaa, released on 5 February 2007 by Motown France. It achieved great success in France, Belgium (Wallonia), and Switzerland.

Background
À fleur de toi contains songwriting collaborations with Mounir Maarouf, Street Fabulous, Elio, and Kurser.

In France, five singles were released from this album. The title track "À fleur de toi" peaked at number 14 on the French Singles Chart and number two on the French Airplay Chart, followed by "Ma Sœur" and "Toi", which reached numbers 10 and 34 on the airplay chart, respectively. "Pourquoi les hommes?", the fourth single, peaked at number 41 on the airplay chart.

Track listing
All songs written by Vitaa and Mounir Maarouf, except where noted.

Special edition

Bonus DVD
"À fleur de toi" (Video)
"Ma Sœur" (Video)
"Toi" (Video)
"Pourquoi les hommes?" (Video)
"Un an avec" (Teaser) (Vitaa, Maarouf, Street Fabulous)

Charts

Weekly charts

Year-end charts

Certifications

References

External links
 

2007 debut albums
Motown albums
Vitaa albums